Bodo Sperling (born 6 May 1952) is a German artist, painter, and inventor.

Life
Sperling grew up in Frankfurt am Main, Leipzig, Amsterdam and Berlin. He started his artistic career in Amsterdam. There he sold his pictures he had painted during the day on the street every night at Club Paradiso (Amsterdam).
One focus of his work is the development of scientific models by looking at the aesthetics, and the implementation of scientific models in objects. In 1985, he calls his art direction "Objectivism". 

Another focus of his work is the documentation of physical processes through their aesthetic. The German philosopher Thomas Metzinger, manager of the workspace Neurophilosophy at Frankfurt Institute for Advanced Studies.  Science Arts writes in the catalogue Transparency of Consciousness that "Its crystal panels were probably the reason why so much attention, because they work in a particular object, the quasi-spiritual principles of order in nature itself to turn aesthetic intuition accessible." 
(See Figure Crystal Object Objectivism)

Since 1985, he has worked with computers as a design tool. Two of his paintings are exhibited at the Center for Art and Media Karlsruhe.

1990/1991 Spokesman of the Federal Association of Artists BBK Frankfurt. 1990 Sperling served as authorized negotiators, negotiations for unification of the Federal Association of Artists with the GDR - Artists Association. He was one of the four founders of the East Side Gallery, Berlin Wall, Berlin. in March 1990.
 
In May 2011 he filed with other artists of the "founding Initiative East Side" complaint before the District Court of Berlin, due to destruction of art and infringement of copyright. The redevelopment of the East Side Gallery in 2009, destroyed most of a listed building images, and their conceptual artistic Character of 1990.
   
Sperling 1992 installed on the 1st Total German artist Congress in Potsdam, a five-meter high mobile, which, illuminated by slides, the impression of a constantly changing 3-D film  produced. From 1980 the first pictures emerged from crystals and crystal panels. Sperling describes his artistic work as Objectivism. 
In 1991 he created at the national exhibition in Kassel, a video installation that confronted the viewer with the objective documentation of Spacetime. It was installed on a several tons of stone altar on which stood a steel basin. In this steel basin formed over time crystals from a boiling solution. The entire process has been documented over several weeks by an automatic camera.
The basis of his work, he sees in line with research by Rupert Sheldrake and his theory of Morphic field.

2016 Sperling received the 4th International André Evard Audience Award of the Messmer Foundation. His Award-winning work titled: obj 1586 is the first from the work series, folded realities. In this series, the focus is on the referentiality between the entities. So the colors depending on the angle of the surfaces with respect to the scalar light source. Sperling makes reference to a philosophical approach of the philosopher Nagarjuna.

Exhibitions 
 1983 Gustav-Siegle-Haus / Stuttgart
 1986 Frankfurter Kunstverein, Das AKTFOTO (The nude photo) ideology - aesthetic - history, Museum of the 20th Century Vienna. 15 years prior to 2000 - the portrayal of violence and brutality is still a priority over the representation of sexuality and eroticism, Time-critical art action, Frankfurt
 1990 co-founder of East Side Gallery November 1989, Berlin, image #18 "The transformation of the pentagram to a peace star in a Europe without walls" 10m x 3,60 m on Berlin Wall
 1990The Pleasures within Distance, Window / Sydney College of the Arts, Sydney, Australia
 1991 Hessian National Exhibition / Kassel
 1992 Kunsthalle Darmstadt, Solo Exhibition, Art Prize of the DAG, Kunsthalle Hamburg, Darmstadt
 1993 Goethe-Institut / Prag, Tschechien
 1994 Museum Wiesbaden Hessiale 94 / Wiesbaden, national art exhibition of the Federal Association of Artists

 2016 Messmer Foundation, Riegel, Germany

Collections, commissions, public art 
 Computer Associates, implementation of the architectural design of the CA firm building in a mural for the entrance hall 1.60mx 3.60m, Acrylic on canvas and design base for the East Side Galley image on the Berlin Wall in 1990, Germany
 East Side Galley, image #18 "The transformation of the pentagram to a peace star in a Europe without walls" 10m x 3,60 m on Berlin Wall. 1990, Berlin, Germany
 Museum of Contemporary Art ZKM Karlsruhe, "B3", 1991, Computer painting on silver photo canvas, 100 x 140 cm · "B7", 1991, Computer painting on silver photo canvas, 100 x 140 cm, Karlsruhe, Germany
 Banca Monte dei Paschi di Siena, implementation of the "Cathedral of Siena", acrylic on canvas 2.20mx 90 cm, Frankfurt / Siena - Italy
 Messmer Foundation, Riegel, Germany, Painting: 'job 1586', 55.11"x 55.11" pigments on canvas

Awards 
 1992 Art Prize of the German Salaried Employees Academy
 2016 Audience Award 4. International André Evard-Award

References

Literature 
 Oberbaum: East Side Gallery Berlin 1991 (catalog)  (catalog)
 Landeskunstausstellung ´94, National Art Exhibition,Wiesbaden, Germany, 1994  (catalog)
 Thomas Metzinger: The Artistic Work of Bodo Sperling in: transparency of consciousness, Digital Art Gallery, Frankfurt, 10. 31. 1997 (catalog)
Hessiale `94, National Art Exhibition Kassel,  (catalog)
 Zylvia Auerbach (ed.): The Pleasures within distance, Sydney, 1990, 
 DuMont: 365 Orte - Eine Reise zu Deutschlands Zukunftsmachern. 
 messmer foundation: 4. International André Eward - Award for concrete-constructive art. 02.13.2016 - 04.24.2016 (catalog)

External links
 Website Bodo Sperling
 
 Bodo Sperling  in the National Libraries Australia
 Bodo Sperling by artfacts.net

1952 births
20th-century German painters
20th-century German male artists
German male painters
21st-century German painters
21st-century German male artists
German conceptual artists
Artists from Berlin
Living people